Dora Cadavid (23 November 1937 – 31 January 2022) was a Colombian actress, singer and announcer. Cadavid participated in over 45 television and theatre productions, making her debut at the age of ten in the play Doña Inés vuelve al convento. With 60 years of career, her most famous performance was probably in Fernando Gaitán's successful soap opera, Yo soy Betty, la fea.

Career

Beginnings 
Cadavid started her career as a declamator for La voz de Antioquia, a local radio show. While working on the show, she was discovered by producer Fausto Cabrera, who linked her to the play Doña Inés vuelve al convento. Later, she set up her own radio station in Medellín, called Ondas Femeninas.

In 1954 she had her first role in a soap opera, called Espectros. However, she continued with this radio work, joining RCN Radio professionally. In 1958 she recorded her first musical album with the local record company Sonolux.

After appearing in the television series Candó and Una vida para amarte, in 1970 Cadavid travelled to Mexico to study theatre. In 1980 she returned to Colombia, settling in Bogotá and immediately joining the cast of the series Rasputin. In the 1980s she appeared in other television productions such as Hato Canaguay, Señora Bonita, Heroínas, Romeo y Buseta and Bodas de sangre.

Yo soy Betty, la fea and further productions 
After appearing in series like Café con aroma de mujer, Amores como el nuestro, Francisco el matemático and Victoria, Cadavid joined the cast of the soap opera Yo soy Betty, la fea, written by Fernando Gaitán and directed by Mario Ribero. The series, in which Cadavid played the role of Inés Ramírez, became the most successful Colombian telenovela of all time, giving international recognition to the actress. After her participation in the series, which aired on RCN between 1999 and 2001, the actress reprised her role in a spin-off called Ecomoda, which did not have the same reception as the original production.

In the 2010 decade, Cadavid performed in series such as La Teacher de inglés, A corazón abierto, El man es Germán, Los graduados y La niña, making her last appearance on Colombian television in the series La ley del corazón in 2017.

Personal life and death 
Cadavid was born in Medellín, Antioquia on 23 November 1937. She was married to José Luis Córdova, who died in 1993. Their son Moisés, actor and theater director, who also worked with Caracol on La Magia de Sofia died in 2012. Cadavid resided in a nursing home in later years. She died on 31 January 2022, at the age of 84. She was also the aunt of actresses María Cecilia Botero and Ana Cristina Botero.

Filmography

Television

Film

References

External links

1937 births
2022 deaths
Colombian telenovela actresses
Colombian film actresses
Colombian television actresses
People from Medellín
20th-century Colombian actresses
21st-century Colombian actresses